The Agăș is a left tributary of the river Trotuș in Romania. It flows into the Trotuș in the village Agăș. The Agăș is the source of the water supply system of the village of Agăș.

References

Rivers of Romania
Rivers of Bacău County